Cheryomushkin is a rural locality (a khutor) in Giaginskoye Rural Settlement of Giaginsky District, Adygea, Russia. The population of this village was 93 as of 2018. There is 1 street.

Geography 
Cheryomushkin is located 19 km south of Giaginskaya (the district's administrative centre) by road. Kelermesskaya is the nearest rural locality.

References 

Rural localities in Giaginsky District